Kamadhenu is a 1941 Tamil-language film directed by Nandalal Jaswantalal and featuring Baby Saroja, Vatsala, K. B. Vatsal and G. Pattu Iyer in the main roles.

Cast
Credits adapted from the Film's songbook
 Shrimathi Vatsala as Anuradha
 Baby Saroja as Kamdhenu & Chandi (Pappayi's son)
 G. Subbulakshmi as Pappayi
 K. N. Kamalam as Lady Doctor Kamala Bai
 K. B. Vatsal as Chandramohan
 G. Pattu Iyer as Zaminder Sir Vasantha Raja
 M. R. S. Mani as Duraisami
 C. N. Sadasivan as Professor Rangasami
 Jolly Kittu Iyer as Head Clerk
 S. Ramachandra Iyer as College Principal
 Kolathu Mani as Mowali Driver
 Master Balachandar as Raju (Hotel Boy)
 S. V. Venkatraman as Sadhu
 G. V. Sharma as Lawyer

Production
The film is almost a family venture. K. Subramanyam's  brother K. Viswanathan, who was the owner of Chitra Talkies, produced the film while K. Subramanyam wrote the story and dialogues. K. Viswanathan also featured as the hero. His wife Vatsala was the heroine. Their daughter Baby Saroja featured as a child artiste.

K. Subramanyam brought Nandalal Jaswantalal, who was a successful director of Hindi films, to direct this film. This the first and only Tamil film he directed.

Soundtrack
S. Rajeswara Rao and Kalyanaraman scored the music under supervision of Papanasam Brothers - Papanasam Sivan and Papanasam Rajagopala Iyer both of whom also penned the lyrics. Background music was composed by Anil Biswas, the songs were recorded by C. E. Biggs.

References

1941 films
1940s Tamil-language films
Indian drama films
Films scored by S. Rajeswara Rao
1941 drama films
Indian black-and-white films